Angry Birds Epic RPG is a free-to-play role-playing video game that is the ninth installment in the Angry Birds series, developed by Chimera Entertainment and published by Rovio Entertainment. The game was announced on March 12, 2014 and features turn-based combat and a crafting system.  The game was soft launched on March 17 on the Australia, New Zealand and Canada App Store, and was released worldwide on June 12, 2014. 

The game was removed from App Store and Google Play in 2019 with all other Angry Birds games released before Angry Birds Transformers (with the exception of Angry Birds Friends). The server for the game was shut down in 2022.

Plot
The storyline begins with the player, playing as Red, trying to recover the stolen eggs by the Pigs. As the player progresses, new birds from the Angry Birds universe are added to the roster, including Chuck, Matilda, Bomb and the Blues (Jay, Jim and Jake). Players are limited to choosing three birds from their roster - and sometimes fewer - in the various battles against the pigs.

Angry Birds Epic is set on Piggy Island, with its characters residing in the existing Angry Birds universe. Pigs and the birds take on various roles in the game's cutscenes.

Gameplay 

Before every level, players can choose up to three birds (one extra from their Facebook friends in some levels) in their party, depending on the level. In the battle, enemies, mostly pigs, appear on a landscape. Battles may be normal, may involve multiple waves of enemies, or boss fights. To attack, players swipe from a bird to an enemy. To use a secondary skill (mostly defense types), the player taps the bird to use it on themselves or swipes a bird into another bird to give it to the other bird. Whenever the birds attack or take damage, a "Rage Chili" indicator fills up at the bottom of the screen. When full, players can apply it to a bird to use their "rage" ability. After winning a battle, the players can earn up to three stars, depending on their performance in that battle. More stars indicate more resources that the players receive as a reward for winning the battle. The golden Lucky Coins, which are rare, are used to buy certain classes, spin the Golden Pig Machine for items, and to buy emergency consumables in battle. They can be earned by defeating a Golden Pig encountered across different levels, leveling up, or through in-app purchases. The gameplay data can be backed up using a Rovio Account, which is now discontinued for registration , Only existing accounts can back up their gameplay data.

Crafting system
Whenever the character is not in battle, players could equip and craft weapons, off-hand items, and consumable items. These items are obtained by crafting them with resources and spending another in-game currency called "Snoutlings", which are often dropped by defeated pigs or treasure chests. Whenever the player crafts or brews something, their quantity (Potions), damage (Weapons), or health (off-hand items) are increased by a random number from zero to three stars.

Multiplayer
In December 2014, Angry Birds Epic was updated to include a multiplayer mode. The Player Arena had weekly leagues that award epic items to the top players. There were different tiers and the highest was the Diamond tier.

Events 
The game periodically released limited time events in which the player could collect event medals or resources, which could be exchanged for rare classes, currency, and items. There were only two events which were collaborations with other mobile games. The first one, Puzzle & Dragons event at October 2014 featured characters from the game as enemies, while some of the birds were limited-time allies in the mobile game of the same name. The second one, Sonic Dash event at September 2015, featuring Sonic as a playable "bird" and enemies from Sonic series, with Dr.Eggman as the boss enemy. Three of the birds were also limited-time playable characters in the mobile game of the same name. The game used to cycle through all the events (excluding the collaboration ones). Since the game was not in development after 2018, the game finally ran out of Arena Seasons, events, and special daily rewards in the beginning of 2021.

Reception

The game has received generally favorable reviews with a Metacritic score of 70/100 based on 14 reviews. CNET praised the solid gameplay, but did not like the numerous in-app purchases combined with the slow delivery of in-game items, as well as the always online to play requirement.

References

External links

 

2014 video games
Android (operating system) games
Epic
BlackBerry games
Delisted digital-only games
Inactive online games
IOS games
Role-playing video games
Windows Phone games
Video games developed in Germany
Rovio Entertainment games
Multiplayer and single-player video games
Products and services discontinued in 2022